Mârza may refer to:

Mârza, a village in Sălcuța, Dolj Commune, Romania
Mârza, a tributary of the Vișeu in Maramureș County, Romania

Family name 
political figure Dumitru Mârza
photographer Samoilă Mârza

See also